Neosyntaxis is a monotypic moth genus in the family Erebidae erected by Rob de Vos in 2012. Its only species, Neosyntaxis warringtonella, was first described by George Thomas Bethune-Baker in 1908. It is found in Papua New Guinea. The habitat consists of mountainous areas.

References

Lithosiina
Monotypic moth genera
Moths described in 1908
Moths of New Guinea